Major-General Edward Frederick Lawson, 4th Baron Burnham, CB, DSO, MC, TD (16 June 1890 – 4 July 1963), was a British newspaper executive and Territorial Army officer who served with distinction in both World Wars.

Early life and family 
Lawson was born on 16 June 1890, the eldest son of Colonel William Levy-Lawson (1864–1943) and his wife Sibyl Mary Marshall, eldest daughter of Lt-Gen Sir Frederick Marshall. His father was the younger son of Edward Levy-Lawson, 1st Baron Burnham, proprietor of The Daily Telegraph and had served in the Scots Guards and then in the part-time Royal Buckinghamshire Yeomanry (Royal Bucks Hussars), with which he had won a Distinguished Service Order (DSO) during the 2nd Boer War. His first  cousin  was Mrs  Dorothy Coke (née  Levy-Lawson, died 1937),  wife of Major Sir John Coke (died 1957). His  daughter Lucia wrote a  book  about Hall Barn, her home  from  age 11  and the  seat of the Baron Burnham family.

Edward Lawson was educated at Eton College and Balliol College, Oxford, where he obtained a third-class degree in modern history in 1913 and played Polo for the university. In 1910 he was commissioned into the Royal Bucks Hussars, of which his father became Honorary Colonel in 1913.

On leaving Oxford, Lawson joined the family newspaper, the Daily Telegraph, as a reporter, first in Paris and then in New York. On the outbreak of war in 1914 he returned to the UK to serve with the Royal Bucks Hussars.

World War I
The Royal Bucks Hussars was embodied on the outbreak of war and went to its war station near Bury St Edmunds, later joining a concentration of mounted troops around Churn on the Berkshire Downs. In November the 2nd Mounted Division, of which the Royal Bucks formed part, was sent to guard the East Coast in Norfolk. In April 1915 the division was shipped to Egypt, where it was reorganised as a small dismounted division and sent to Gallipoli.

2nd Mounted Division landed at Suvla Bay on the night of 17/18 August, with Lawson acting as landing officer. Three days later it was sent into action at the Battle of Scimitar Hill, when it was intended to push through to the second objective after the main Turkish positions had been captured. The Yeomanry moved up at 17.00, marching from their bivouacs across the plain of the Salt Lake, where they 'presented such a target as artillerymen dream of'. On reaching Chocolate Hill they paused to reorganise before moving on towards Scimitar Hill through blinding dust and smoke, with little idea of what they were supposed to do and suffering heavy casualties. Most of the division halted at Green Hill, but Brigadier-General Lord Longford led his 2nd South Midland Mounted Brigade (including the Royal Bucks Hussars) in a charge over Green Hill and up to the summit of Scimitar Hill. Longford was killed, and his men were finally driven from the summit.

The casualties at Scimitar Hill had been so severe, and manpower wastage through the summer was so heavy, that the 2nd South Midland Mounted Brigade had to be temporarily reorganised as a single regiment, and was evacuated to Egypt in November for rest and recuperation, where it was reunited with its horses. After service in the Senussi Campaign with the Western Frontier Force, the Royal Bucks Hussars went to Palestine to join the Imperial Mounted Division, with which it served in the First and Second Battles of Gaza. The regiment then transferred to the Yeomanry Mounted Division and fought with it in the Third Battle of Gaza and at the Battle of Mughar Ridge, where it participated in a notable mounted charge. It was involved in Allenby's entry into Jerusalem.

In April 1918 the Royal Bucks Hussars went to France to serve on the Western Front, but Lawson was not with them: he had been appointed at age 26 acting Lieutenant-Colonel to command the 1st County of London (Middlesex) Yeomanry, which continued to serve with the Desert Mounted Corps in Palestine for the rest of the war, including the Battle of Megiddo. During the final pursuit towards Damascus, Lawson's regiment was lent to T. E. Lawrence, under whose orders it charged the enemy rear and drove them into a trap, completing the destruction of the Turkish Fourth Army.

During the war Lawson was awarded a DSO, MC and three mentions in despatches.

Newspaperman
After the war, Lawson returned to the Daily Telegraph, where he was known as 'The Colonel', and served as effective second-in-command to his uncle Harry Levy-Lawson, 2nd Baron Burnham, who had inherited the newspaper and been created Viscount Burnham. On 28 January 1920 he married Marie Enid Robson, only daughter of Hugh Scott Robson.

The Daily Telegraph was losing circulation, and to Lawson's disappointment his uncle decided to sell it to the Berry Brothers in 1927. Sir William Berry (soon to be created Lord Camrose) was impressed by Lawson's ability and made him general manager of the business. Lawson joked that this was because he was the only person capable of finding his way around the labyrinthine Telegraph offices. Lawson was a moderniser and skilful negotiator, supervising the installation of new printing plant, the takeover of The Morning Post in 1937, and chairing the labour committee of the Newspaper Publishers' Association for 25 years. After his father succeeded as 3rd Baron Burnham in 1933, he was styled the Hon. Edward Lawson.

Territorial officer
Lawson maintained his links to the Territorial Army between the wars, helping the Royal Bucks Hussars to convert to Royal Artillery and then to merge with the Berkshire Yeomanry to form the 99th (Buckinghamshire and Berkshire Yeomanry) Field Brigade, Royal Artillery, which he commanded from 1929 until 1933 (his uncle, Viscount Burnham, was also the regiment's Honorary Colonel).

Unusually for a Territorial officer, he was appointed Commander, Royal Artillery, (CRA) of 48th (South Midland) Division in 1938, with the rank of Brigadier.

World War II
On the outbreak of war, 48th Division was mobilised, and it landed in France as part of the British Expeditionary Force in January 1940. When the Germans invaded France and the Low Countries in May, the BEF moved forward to occupy pre-planned positions in Belgium, but the rapid German breakthrough into France caused it to retreat towards Dunkirk.

On 23 May, 48th Division was pulled out to form a new defence line along the canal between Saint-Omer and the coast. Lawson was sent with 'X Force' of artillery, machine guns and infantry ahead of the division to occupy the chosen positions. However, the unexpected surrender of Belgian forces on 27 May 1940 led to a gap appearing between 48th Division in action around Saint-Omer and the coast at Nieuwpoort. Until II Corps could arrive to plug this gap, Lawson was responsible for what the Official History calls 'the most dangerously exposed part of the bridgehead'. He was ordered by the commander of the Dunkirk perimeter, Lt-Gen Ronald Adam to improvise a defence line along the canal and prevent the Germans breaking through to the vital beaches east of Dunkirk where much of the BEF was waiting to be evacuated. At 11.00 on 28 May, advanced German troops reached the canal line, but Lawson seized on the Territorial gunners of 53rd (London) Medium Regiment, RA who were marching towards Dunkirk having fired off all their ammunition and destroyed their guns. Together with detachments of Regular gunners from 2nd Medium Regiment and 1st Heavy Anti-Aircraft Regiment, and sappers from 7th Field Company Royal Engineers, they fought as infantry to hold the line. They came under heavy mortar and machine-gun fire, and the Germans seized a bridgehead at Nieuwpoort, but all subsequent attacks that day were repulsed. Lawson's scratch force was relieved next day and then evacuated to Britain.

Lawson was awarded a CB for distinguished service in this campaign. In February 1941 he was promoted to Major-General and appointed General Officer Commanding the new Yorkshire County Division, responsible for three Independent Infantry Brigades that had been organised for Home Defence from newly raised battalions.

On the death of his father on 14 June 1943, Edward Lawson succeeded as 4th Baron Burnham of Hall Barn, Beaconsfield, Buckinghamshire, and as the 4th Baronet.

With his newspaper background, Lawson became Senior Military Adviser to the Ministry of Information and was Director of Public Relations at the War Office from 1943 to 1945.

Postwar
Lord Burnham returned to the Daily Telegraph as managing director in 1945, remaining in the post until his retirement in 1961.

He died in the Middlesex Hospital on 4 July 1963, and was succeeded as 5th Baron by his eldest son.

Family
Lord and Lady Burnham had three children:
 William Edward Harley Lawson, 5th Baron Burnham, (1920–1993)
 Lucia Edith Lawson (1922–2011), married Roger Marquis, 2nd Earl of Woolton, divorced 1953.
 Hugh John Frederick Lawson, 6th Baron Burnham, (1931–2005)

Publications
 Peterborough Court: The Story of the Daily Telegraph, 1955.

Honours
 Companion of the Bath
 Distinguished Service Order
 Military Cross
 Territorial Decoration
 Three Mentions in despatches

Notes

References
 C. F. Aspinall-Oglander, History of the Great War: Military Operations Gallipoli, May 1915 to the Evacuation, London: Heinemann, 1932/Imperial War Museum & Battery Press, 1992, ISBN, 0-89839-175-X.
 Maj A. F. Becke,History of the Great War: Order of Battle of Divisions, Part 2a: The Territorial Force Mounted Divisions and the 1st-Line Territorial Force Divisions (42–56), London: HM Stationery Office, 1935/Uckfield: Naval & Military Press, 2007, .
 Sir Arthur Bryant, The Turn of the Tide, 1939–1943, London: Collins, 1957.
 David L. Bullock, Allenby's War: The Palestine-Arabian Campaigns 1916–1918, London: Blandford Press, 1988, .
 Burke's Peerage, Baronetage and Knightage, 100th Edn, London, 1953.
 Lt-Col Ewan Butler and Maj J.S. Bradford, The Story of Dunkirk, London: Hutchinson/Arrow, nd.
 Major L. F. Ellis, History of the Second World War, United Kingdom Military Series: The War in France and Flanders 1939–1940, London: HM Stationery Office, 1954.
 
 T. E. Lawrence, Seven Pillars of Wisdom, London: Jonathan Cape, 1935/Penguin Classics, 1962, ..
 Norman E. H. Litchfield, The Territorial Artillery 1908–1988 (Their Lineage, Uniforms and Badges), Nottingham: Sherwood Press, 1992, .
 John North, Gallipoli: The Fading Vision, London: Faber & Faber, 1936.
 F. W. Perry, Order of Battle of Divisions Part 5A. The Divisions of Australia, Canada and New Zealand and those in East Africa, Newport: Ray Westlake Military Books, 1992, .
 F. W. Perry, History of the Great War: Order of Battle of Divisions, Part 5b: Indian Army Divisions, Newport: Ray Westlake, 1993, .
 Huw Richards, 'Lawson, Edward Frederick, fourth Baron Burnham (1890–1963)', Oxford Dictionary of National Biography, Oxford: University Press, 2004–15.

External sources
53rd London Medium Regiment website
Land Forces of Britain, the Empire and Commonwealth (Regiments.org)
Generals of World War II

|-

People educated at Eton College
Alumni of Balliol College, Oxford
The Daily Telegraph people
Edward 4
Royal Buckinghamshire Yeomanry officers
Companions of the Order of the Bath
Companions of the Distinguished Service Order
Recipients of the Military Cross
British Army personnel of World War I
Royal Artillery officers
British Army major generals
British Army generals of World War II
Eldest sons of British hereditary barons
1890 births
1963 deaths
20th-century English businesspeople